A  (plural: cippi; "pointed pole") is a low, round or rectangular pedestal set up by the Ancient Romans for purposes such as a milestone or a boundary post. They were also used for somewhat differing purposes by the Etruscans and Carthaginians.

Roman cippi 
Roman cippi were made of wood or stone; inscriptions on the stone cippi indicate their function or the area that they surrounded, like sanctuaries and temple areas. In Rome they marked the limits of the pomerium, the course of aqueducts and the cursus publicus. Cippi lined up in rows were also often numbered, often featuring the name of the person placing them or the distance to the nearest cippus. The inscriptions on some cippi show that they were occasionally used as funeral memorials.

Etruscan cippi 
Between 800–100 BCE cippi were used by the Etruscans as tombstones, which were shaped differently depending on the place and time of origin. Cippi were set up as a stele, column or sculpture in the dromos of an Etruscan grave or at the grave entrance. They had magical and religious significance. Cippi may have the shape of a cube, knob, onion, egg, ball or cylinder. There are connections between certain shapes and the representation of canopic jars; cinerary urns that were made in the shape of a human torso, and the head as a lid.

In Cerveteri, the cippi of female and male burials were different. Male dead received a column (phallus), women small houses or temples.
The  monuments (6th – 5th centuries BCE) from the area around Chiusi show a combination of the cinerary urn and cippus. They contain the ashes of the dead in an opening in their base.
In Orvieto two so-called warrior head cippi have images of human heads (late 6th century BCE).
In Perugia, fluted columns with acanthus were used.
From the 4th century BCE cippi also have name inscriptions.

The "Cippus Abellanus" (in the Oscan language), like the "Cippus Perusinus", is not a tombstone.

Punic cippi 
Carthaginian cippi have a base similar to Egyptian steles, which are sometimes also referred to as cippi (for example the "Metternich Cippi" in the Metropolitan Museum of Art). They are found in North Africa, but also in Sardinia (Cagliari, Teti, Tharros), Sicily (Motya) and Spain (Huelva and Barcelona). The Cippi of Melqart, found in Malta, which bear a Phoenician and a Greek inscription, made it possible for the first time to understand the Phoenician alphabet.

Gallery

References

Further reading

External links 

Ancient Roman architecture
Funerary steles